Kate Hackett is an actress, writer, and producer best known for creating & starring as Alice Rackham in the Amazon web series Classic Alice. She is also known for Hulu's Best Laid Plans and Netflix's Real Rob.

Career

Hackett acted in plays and musicals from a young age. She began acting in film at Boston University, studied with several LA studios, and graduated from Upright Citizens Brigade Theatre.

Hackett was cast in Hulu's all-improv series Best Laid Plans in 2010 and was selected to play the romantic lead. After getting her start in the web world, Hackett went on to write and produce several short sketches. Her short, written by and produced with Mark Kosin,  "A Special Message for America's Teenagers" reached Funny or Die's front page and amassed nearly 10,000 views. After finding success on Funny or Die, she wrote and shot Kate & Joe Just Want to Have Sex, which recorded over half a million views. Hackett was then approached by a team and she began working on Classic Alice.

Both her writing and acting work on Classic Alice were praised as "smart, funny, and absolutely addictive,". Hypable called the acting and dialogue "fast-paced and witty" and commended the writing for using "...a less pop culture-saturated book". Hypable went on to add: "The main character, Alice Rackham (played by series creator Kate Hackett), is likeable and instantly relatable." GeekyNews said: "Kate Hackett, who also writes the show, brings a character to the screen that is unlike anyone we’ve seen on YouTube. Kate is captivating and has a way of making you fall in love with Alice’s quirks and awkwardness. She portrays a relatable heroine whose many nuances make sure that everyone can see a part of themselves in the character.". Classic Alice garnered over 1.5 million views to date.

After Classic Alice, Hackett booked a small role on Rob Schneider's sitcom Real Rob. He had this to say about her acting: "[Kate is] truly funny. Every take was hilarious. That's hard, a lot of people can't do that."

In 2016, she completed a series called Not a Plan. In 2017 she began work on a new short film The Long Dig with the creator of Personal Space, Tom Pike as a producer and writer and lead actor.

References

Living people
American television writers
Boston University alumni
American web series actresses
21st-century American actresses
American stage actresses
American voice actresses
Year of birth missing (living people)
American women television writers